The  Information Technology Infrastructure Library (ITIL)  is a set of detailed practices for IT activities such as IT service management (ITSM) and IT asset management (ITAM) that focus on aligning IT services with the needs of the business.

ITIL describes processes, procedures, tasks, and checklists which are neither organization-specific nor technology-specific but can be applied by an organization toward strategy, delivering value, and maintaining a minimum level of competency.  It allows the organization to establish a baseline from which it can plan, implement, and measure.  It is used to demonstrate compliance and to measure improvement. There is no formal independent third-party compliance assessment available for ITIL compliance in an organization. Certification in ITIL is only available to individuals. Since 2021, ITIL has been owned by PeopleCert.

History
Responding to growing dependence on IT, the UK Government's Central Computer and Telecommunications Agency (CCTA) in the 1980s developed a set of recommendations designed to standardize IT management practices across government functions, built around a process model-based view of controlling and managing operations often credited to W. Edwards Deming and his plan-do-check-act (PDCA) cycle.

 In 1989, ITIL was released.  It grew to a series of 30 books that recommended and provided IT best practices that focused on and catered for client and business needs.
 In April 2001, the CCTA was merged into the Office of Government Commerce (OGC), an office of the UK Treasury.
 In 2001, ITIL Version 2 was released.
 In May 2007, ITIL Version 3 was released (also known as the ITIL Refresh Project) consisting of 26 processes and functions, now grouped into only 5 volumes, arranged around the concept of Service lifecycle structure. ITIL Version 3 is now known as ITIL 2007 Edition.
 In 2009, the OGC officially announced that ITIL Version 2 certification would be withdrawn and launched a major consultation as per how to proceed.
 In July 2011, ITIL 2011 was released. 
 In 2013, ITIL was acquired by AXELOS, a joint venture between Capita and the UK Cabinet Office. 
 In February 2019, ITIL version 4 was released. The main changes were: to consider end-to-end Service Management from holistic and value-centric perspectives, to align with philosophies such as Agile, DevOps, and Lean, and to reduce the emphasis on IT Service Management in favor of general Service Management.
 In 2009 and 2011, researchers investigated the benefits of the ITIL implementation.
 In June 2021, PeopleCert completed the acquisition of Axelos.

See also
 Application Services Library – A similar framework for application management
 Business Information Services Library (BiSL) – A similar framework for information management and functional management
 ISO/IEC 20000 – An international standard for IT service management
 Tudor IT Process Assessment – A framework for assessment of IT service management maturity

References

External links

 

 
Information technology consulting
Method engineering